The Northwest African Air Service Command (NAASC) was a sub-command of the Northwest African Air Forces which itself was a sub-command of the Mediterranean Air Command (MAC). These new Allied air force organizations were created at the Casablanca Conference in January 1943 to promote cooperation between the British Royal Air Force (RAF), the American United States Army Air Force (USAAF), and their respective ground and naval forces in the North African and Mediterranean Theater of Operations (MTO).  Effective March 4, 1943, Brigadier General Delmar Dunton became the commander of NAASC which consisted of service units from the United States Army 12th Air Force Service Command which Dunton had overseen since September 30, 1942, and similar units from the British RAF Middle East Command. In June 1943, prior to the invasion of Sicily (Operation Husky), Brigadier General Harold Bartron became the commander of NAASC. On December 10, 1943, MAC was disbanded and NAASC was reorganized in the newly established Mediterranean Allied Air Forces.

References

Intermediate service commands of the United States Army Air Forces
Military units and formations of the Royal Air Force in World War II
Military units and formations established in 1943